Monte Bove Sud is a mountain of Marche, Italy. It has an elevation of 2,169 metres above sea level.

Mountains of Marche
Mountains of the Apennines